A pulser pump is a gas lift device that uses gravity to pump water to a higher elevation. It has no moving parts.

Operation
A pulser pump makes use of water that flows through pipes and an air chamber from an upper reservoir to a lower reservoir. The intake is a trompe, which uses water flow to pump air to a separation chamber; air trapped in the chamber then drives an airlift pump. The top of the pipe that connects the upper reservoir to the air chamber is positioned just below the water surface. As the water drops down the pipe, air is sucked down with it. The air forms a "bubble" near the roof of the air chamber. A narrow riser pipe extends from the air chamber up to the higher elevation to which the water will be pumped.

Initially the water level will be near the roof of the air chamber. As air accumulates, pressure builds, which will push water up into the riser pipe. At some point the "air bubble" will extend below the bottom of the riser pipe, which will allow some of the air to escape through the riser, pushing the water that is already in the pipe up with it. As the air escapes, the water level in the air chamber will rise again. The alternating pressure build up and escape causes a pulsing effect, hence the name: pulser pump.

The maximum air pressure that can accumulate depends on the height of the water column between the air chamber and the lower reservoir. The deeper the air chamber is positioned, the higher the elevation to which the water can be pumped. The depth of the air chamber position is limited by the depth to which the flowing water can pull the air from the surface of the upper reservoir down to the chamber. This depth partially depends on the speed of the water, which in turn depends on the difference in height between the upper and lower reservoir.

History
Brian White, stonemason by profession, claims to have invented the pulser pump in 1987. He put the idea in the public domain.

However, Charles H. Taylor invented the hydraulic air compressor before the year 1910 while living in Montreal. The working principle of the hydraulic air compressor and the pulser pump is exactly the same. But the purpose of the compressor is to generate compressed air. Expelling the water up to 30 meter high serves to prevent potentially damaging
over-pressure. The primary purpose of the pulser pump is to use the air pressure to expel the water to a higher elevation.

See also
 Hydraulic ram
 Airlift pump

References

External links
 The Pulser Pump
 How the pulser pump works
 Appropedia: Pulser pump
 Worlds simplest water pump Video

Pumps